Astro is a contract bridge bidding convention used to intervene over an opponent's one notrump (1NT) opening bid. The name is derived from the initials of the surnames of its inventors - Paul Allinger, Roger Stern and Lawrence Rosler.

Astro employs a 2-level overcall in a minor suit when  holds an unbalanced hand with at least nine cards in two suits, at least one of which is a major; hand strength should be unsuitable for, or not strong enough for a penalty double, typically no more than 15 points.  The minor suit overcalls are artificial and carry the following meanings:  
2 shows at least 5-4 or 4-5 length in hearts and a minor suit, and
2 shows at least 5-4 or 4-5 length in spades and another suit.

When playing Astro but not holding the prescribed two-suited hand, the following calls are available over the 1NT opening by the opponents:
an overcall of 2 or 2 is natural showing a single-suited hand
Double is for penalties

Subsequent bidding
For purposes of subsequent bidding, the major suit indicated by the Astro Intervenor is termed the “anchor major”; the cheapest unbid suit is called the "neutral" suit.
Depending upon action taken by the responder to the 1NT opener, Advancer may:
Pass when weak and holding six cards in the minor bid by the Intervenor, or
Raise the anchor major: (a) to the 2 level with at least 3-card support, preferably with an honour, and no game intentions, or (b) raise to the 3 level with at least 4-card support and inviting game, cognizant of vulnerability and the point range of the 1NT opening, or (c) raise to the 4 level with at least 4-card support for game-try, or
Bid an artificial and forcing 2NT to show some support in the anchor suit, game interest but no potential to bid further, or
Bid a new suit take-out or new suit jump, to show a 6-card or longer suit, or
Make a negative bid of 2 in the neutral suit to indicate having no other options, usually less than 3 cards headed by an honour in the anchor suit and at least a doubleton in the neutral suit.
Intervenor rebids include:
Pass after a neutral response with five cards in the neutral suit, or
a bid of the anchor major to show 5 cards, or
a bid of the second suit at the 3-level to show 6 cards and good playing strength.

Variations
In the following variations of Astro, the overcalls indicate more specific information about suit combinations:

Modified Astro
2 shows a long heart suit with or without a long minor
2 shows spades and a minor suit
2 shows hearts and spades

Pinpoint Astro
2 shows hearts and clubs
2 shows hearts and diamonds
2 shows hearts and spades
2 shows spades and a minor suit
2NT shows both minors

Roth-Stone Astro
2 shows clubs and spades
2 shows diamonds and spades
3 shows clubs and hearts
3 shows diamonds and hearts
Double shows hearts and spades against a strong 1NT opening; against a weak 1NT, it is penalty oriented showing at least 15 high card points.

Defense against Astro
Responder to the 1NT opener may:
Double with holdings in the anchor suit and in the minor overcalled, or
Cuebid the anchor suit when the hand is unsuited to defense, or
Pass, waiting, or
Bid a natural 2NT, invitational to game.

Alternative conventions

Several other bidding conventions use a variety of schemes to compete against a 1NT opening; these include: Aspro, Asptro, Brozel, Cappelletti, DONT, Landy and Ripstra.

References

Bridge conventions